Devogelia is a genus of flowering plants from the orchid family, Orchidaceae. , it contains only one known species, Devogelia intonsa, native to New Guinea and Maluku.

See also 
 List of Orchidaceae genera

References 

 Berg Pana, H. 2005. Handbuch der Orchideen-Namen. Dictionary of Orchid Names. Dizionario dei nomi delle orchidee. Ulmer, Stuttgart

External links 

Monotypic Epidendroideae genera
Collabieae genera
Orchids of New Guinea
Orchids of Indonesia